The following is a list of significant formulae involving the mathematical constant .

Euclidean geometry

where  is the circumference of a circle,  is the diameter. More generally,

More generally,

where  is the area enclosed by an ellipse with semi-major axis  and semi-minor axis .

where  is the area between the witch of Agnesi and its asymptotic line;  is the radius of the defining circle.

where  is the area of an epicycloid with the smaller circle of radius  and the larger circle of radius , assuming the initial point lies on the larger circle.

where  is the area of a rose with angular frequency  and amplitude .

where  is the perimeter of the lemniscate of Bernoulli with focal distance .

Regular convex polygons
Sum  of internal angles of a regular convex polygon with  sides:

Area  of a regular convex polygon with  sides and side length :

Inradius  of a regular convex polygon with  sides and side length :

Circumradius  of a regular convex polygon with  sides and side length :

Physics
The cosmological constant:

Heisenberg's uncertainty principle:

Einstein's field equation of general relativity:

Coulomb's law for the electric force in vacuum:
 

Magnetic permeability of free space:

Approximate period of a simple pendulum with small amplitude:

Exact period of a simple pendulum with amplitude  ( is the arithmetic–geometric mean):

Kepler's third law of planetary motion:

The buckling formula:

A puzzle involving "colliding billiard balls":

is the number of collisions made (in ideal conditions, perfectly elastic with no friction) by an object of mass m initially at rest between a fixed wall and another object of mass b2Nm, when struck by the other object. (This gives the digits of π in base b up to N digits past the radix point.)

Formulae yielding

Integrals
 (integrating two halves  to obtain the area of the unit circle)

 

 (see also Cauchy distribution)

 (see Gaussian integral).

  (when the path of integration winds once counterclockwise around 0. See also Cauchy's integral formula).

 (see also Proof that 22/7 exceeds ).

 (where  is the arithmetic–geometric mean; see also elliptic integral)

Note that with symmetric integrands , formulas of the form  can also be translated to formulas .

Efficient infinite series

 (see also Double factorial)

 (see Chudnovsky algorithm)

 (see Srinivasa Ramanujan, Ramanujan–Sato series)

The following are efficient for calculating arbitrary binary digits of :

 (see Bailey–Borwein–Plouffe formula)

Plouffe's series for calculating arbitrary decimal digits of :

Other infinite series

 (see also Basel problem and Riemann zeta function)

 , where B2n is a Bernoulli number.

 (see Leibniz formula for pi)

 (Newton, Second Letter to Oldenburg, 1676)

 (Madhava series)

In general,

where  is the th Euler number.

 (see Gregory coefficients)

 (where  is the rising factorial)

 (Nilakantha series)

 (where  is the n-th Fibonacci number)

   (where  is the number of prime factors of the form  of )

   (where  is the number of prime factors of the form  of )

The last two formulas are special cases of

which generate infinitely many analogous formulas for  when 

Some formulas relating  and harmonic numbers are given here. Further infinite series involving π are:

where  is the Pochhammer symbol for the rising factorial. See also Ramanujan–Sato series.

Machin-like formulae

 (the original Machin's formula)

Infinite products
 (Euler)
where the numerators are the odd primes; each denominator is the multiple of four nearest to the numerator.

 (see also Wallis product)

 (another form of Wallis product)

Viète's formula:

A double infinite product formula involving the Thue–Morse sequence:

Arctangent formulas

where  such that .

where  is the k-th Fibonacci number.

A special case is

Complex exponential formulas

 (Euler's identity)

The following equivalences are true for any complex :

Continued fractions

 (Ramanujan,  is the lemniscate constant)

For more on the fourth identity, see Euler's continued fraction formula.

(See also Continued fraction and Generalized continued fraction.)

Iterative algorithms

 (closely related to Viète's formula)
 (where  is the h+1-th entry of m-bit Gray code)
 (cubic convergence)

 (Archimedes' algorithm, see also harmonic mean and geometric mean)

For more iterative algorithms, see the Gauss–Legendre algorithm and Borwein's algorithm.

Asymptotics 
 (asymptotic growth rate of the central binomial coefficients)

 (asymptotic growth rate of the Catalan numbers)

 (Stirling's approximation)

 (where  is Euler's totient function)

Miscellaneous

 (Euler's reflection formula, see Gamma function)

 (the functional equation of the Riemann zeta function)

 (where  is the Hurwitz zeta function and the derivative is taken with respect to the first variable)

 (see also Beta function)

 (where agm is the arithmetic–geometric mean)

 (where )

 (due to Gauss,  is the lemniscate constant)

 (where  is the principal value of the complex logarithm)

 (where  is the remainder upon division of n by k)

 (summing a circle's area)

 (Riemann sum to evaluate the area of the unit circle)

 (by combining Stirling's approximation with Wallis product)

 (where  is the modular lambda function)

See also

References

Notes

Other

.

Further reading
Peter Borwein, The Amazing Number Pi
Kazuya Kato, Nobushige Kurokawa, Saito Takeshi: Number Theory 1: Fermat's Dream. American Mathematical Society, Providence 1993, .

Pi
Pi
Pi algorithms